Hayyim Samuel Jacob Falk (1708 – 17 April 1782), also known as the Baal Shem of London and Doctor Falckon, was a rabbi, baal shem, mekubbal and alchemist.

Biography
Falk was born in either Furth in Bavaria or Pidhaytsi in Podolia. After having narrowly escaped being burnt at the stake by the authorities in Westphalia who had charged him with sorcery, the German Count Alexander Leopold Anton von Rantzau secretly gave him refuge in Holzminden. During this stay in 1736, Falk made his impressive kabbalistic performances in Rantzau's castle, witnessed by noblemen and Alexander's son Count Georg Ludwig Albrecht von Rantzau. In his famous Mémoires du comte de Rantzow, which are referred to by many researchers as an original standard source, this young Count gives a thorough and detailed account of all these mystic demonstrations. Sometime after 1736, Falk arrived in London. He lived at 35 Prescott Street, London, United Kingdom and at Wellclose Square, London until his death. He was a neighbour of Emanuel Swedenborg and there is some evidence that he had a significant influence on him.

Rabbi Jacob Emden accused him of being a Sabbatean, as he invited Moses David of Podhayce, a known supporter of Sabbatai Zevi with connections to Jonathan Eibeschutz, to his home.

He died on 17 April 1782 and was buried in Alderney Road Cemetery, Mile End, London. Falk bequeathed in his will an annual sum of 100 pounds to the Great Synagogue of London as well as some Sifrei Torah.

Folklore
Many stories exist regarding Falk's extraordinary powers. According to one account, Falk made secretive visits to Epping Forest in his carriage, where he was said to have buried some treasure. On one of these occasions a wheel came loose from the vehicle on the Whitechapel Road, but followed the carriage all the way to the forest. When Falk ran short of coal, he was said to have performed a magical feat involving three shirts and a ram's horn. Falk was also able to keep candles burning miraculously, and to transport objects from one place to another.

Some claimed that he had saved the Great Synagogue from fire by writing something in Hebrew on the pillars of the door.

Diary  
Falk kept a diary containing records of dreams and the Kabbalistic names of angels. This can be found in the library of the United Synagogue in London. In 2002 Michal Oron published the diary and a biography of Falk. The diary is written in Hebrew and is very cryptic. The diary was published together with the diary of Falk's assistant, Tsvee Hirsch of Kalish.

Notes 
1.Variations of this portrait, originally subtitled "Baal Shem", are sometimes erroneously used to represent the Baal Shem Tov.

References

 Picciotto, James. Sketches of Anglo-Jewish History. London: Soncino Press, 1956.
 
 
 
 Rantzow, George Louis Albert (Georg Ludwig Albrecht von Rantzau). Mémoires du comte de Rantzow, vol. 1, Pierre Mortier Amsterdam (1741). First translation ever published by Renate Ricarda Timmermann: Die Memoiren des Grafen von Rantzau, vol. 1, Profund-Verlag (2015),

Footnotes

External links
 Dr. Samuel Jacob Falk: A Sabbatian Adventurer in the Masonic Underground by Marsha Keith Schuchard

Baal Shem
Kabbalists
18th-century German rabbis
18th-century English rabbis
1708 births
1782 deaths
English alchemists
Practical Kabbalah
German emigrants to the Kingdom of Great Britain
British Orthodox rabbis
British people of German-Jewish descent
Rabbis from London
18th-century alchemists